This is a list of schools in the state of Western Australia, located outside the Perth metropolitan area. The Western Australian education system traditionally consists of primary schools, which accommodate students from kindergarten to Year 6, and high schools, which accommodate students from Years 7 to 12. Previously primary schools accounted for Year 7 education, but in 2015 all Western Australian schools transitioned Year 7 to be a part of the high school system. In country areas, District High Schools serve as both a primary and a junior high school, with students generally commuting to or boarding at larger towns to finish the last two years of their education.

Public schools

Primary schools

District high schools
The term "district high school" in Western Australia typically means a primary school combined with a high school on the one campus which services the educational needs of a rural district. The term came into use in the 1970s; prior to this, such schools were either known as "Junior High Schools" or simply "Schools" (covering the same range of years), or "Primary Schools" which were limited to year 7, and started serving high school students only upon becoming DHSs.

High schools

Historically, a Junior High School (JHS) was a primary school with a Year 8–10 component (now known as a District High School), a High School (HS) was a high school limited to Year 8–10, whilst a Senior High School (SHS) was a high school extending to year 12.

Other schools
This is a list of all other schools operated by, or under, the Western Australian Department of Education and Training. These include special schools for the disabled, the School of the Air and remote community schools which usually represent an Aboriginal community and typically offer a multilingual education in the local language and/or Kriol, and English. While some of these remote schools are new and have been established on behalf of the community, others were previously mission schools and were funded and operated by religious orders or private benefactors.

Defunct public schools

Closures since 1980

Earlier closures

Non-government schools

K–12 and secondary schools

Primary schools

Defunct non-government schools

See also

List of schools in Australia
Education in Western Australia

References

External links
Schools Online, a directory of Government schools in Western Australia. (Department of Education and Training – Government of Western Australia)
School Search, at Catholic Education Office of Western Australia.
Search for School, at Association of Independent Schools of Western Australia.

Lists of schools in Western Australia